Raminder Singh Awla is a Former member of the Punjab Legislative Assembly from Jalalabad constituency.  He won the 2019 Jalalabad by-election on the Indian National Congress ticket by defeating Shiromani Akali Dal candidate Raj Singh Dibbipura by 16,000 votes. His former Professions before entering politics  were such as Business and Agriculture. In family life, he has a healthy marriage and 2 children. Notably, he is the first candidate in 17 years which brought the Congress Party to victory in the Jalalabad Constituency.

References

1974 births
Living people
Indian National Congress politicians from Punjab, India